Adolphus Frederick V (22 July 1848 – 11 June 1914) was reigning grand duke of Mecklenburg-Strelitz from 1904 to 1914.

Biography
Duke George Adolphus Frederick Augustus Victor Ernest Adalbert Gustavus William Wellington of Mecklenburg-Strelitz was born in Neustrelitz, the only surviving child of Frederick William, Grand Duke of Mecklenburg, and Princess Augusta of Cambridge. Following the death of his grandfather Grand Duke George on 6 September 1860, Adolphus Frederick became the heir apparent to the grand duchy of Mecklenburg-Strelitz with the title of Hereditary Grand Duke. Adolphus Frederick took part in the Franco-Prussian war and represented his father at the crowning of King William I of Prussia as German Emperor at Versailles. He succeeded his father as grand duke on 30 May 1904.

His mother, Grand Duchess Augusta, was disgusted at her son's military ways. She wrote to her niece, Mary of Teck, "Strelitz that was never a Military State, suddenly is all drums and fifes, ... such a pity, a bad imitation of Schwerin & small German Courts, whilst we were a Gentlemanlike Civilian court!" 

In 1907 Adolphus Frederick announced that he would grant Mecklenburg-Strelitz a constitution, but this was met with opposition from nobles. In his attempt to create a constitution he offered to pay $2,500,000 to the national treasury if the nobles and land-owning classes dropped their opposition. In 1912 he repeated attempts to create a constitution for Mecklenburg-Strelitz, which along with Mecklenburg-Schwerin were the only European states without one.

In January 1914, Adolphus Frederick was reported to be the second richest person in Germany after the Emperor William II with a fortune of $88,750,000.

Adolphus Frederick died in Berlin and was succeeded by his eldest son Adolphus Frederick VI.

Marriage and children
Adolphus Frederick was married on 17 April 1877 in Dessau to Elisabeth of Anhalt. His mother commented on his wife, "She welters in happiness at her luxurious "Schloss" wearing a new Paris dress daily, Diamonds, also, when we are quite entre nous - Yes, she does enjoy being a Grand Duchess! poor dear, I am glad she does, for I never did."

Adolphus Frederick and Elisabeth had four children.

Duchess Marie of Mecklenburg-Strelitz (1878–1948) married 22 June 1899 and divorced 31 December 1908 Count George Jametel (1859–1944), married secondly on 11 August 1914 Prince Julius Ernst of Lippe (1873–1952).
Duchess Jutta of Mecklenburg-Strelitz (1880–1946) married 27 July 1899 Danilo, Crown Prince of Montenegro.
Adolphus Frederick VI, Grand Duke of Mecklenburg-Strelitz (1882–1918).
Duke Karl Borwin of Mecklenburg-Strelitz (Karl Borwin Christian Alexander Arthur, Herzog von Mecklenburg-Strelitz; 10 October 1888 – 24 August 1908); killed in a duel with his brother-in-law Count George Jametel, defending his sister's honor.

Honours
He received the following orders and decorations:

Ancestry

References

Books

1848 births
1914 deaths
Protestant monarchs
Dukes of Mecklenburg-Strelitz
House of Mecklenburg-Strelitz
People from Neustrelitz
Hereditary Grand Dukes of Mecklenburg-Strelitz
Grand Dukes of Mecklenburg-Strelitz
Generals of Cavalry (Prussia)
German people of English descent
Recipients of the Military Merit Cross (Mecklenburg-Schwerin)
Recipients of the Iron Cross (1870), 2nd class
Recipients of the Order of the White Eagle (Russia)
Recipients of the Order of St. Anna, 1st class
Recipients of the Order of Saint Stanislaus (Russian), 1st class
Recipients of the Order of St. George of the Fourth Degree
Honorary Knights Grand Cross of the Order of the Bath
Extra Knights Companion of the Garter
Grand Crosses of the Order of the Star of Romania
Military personnel from Mecklenburg-Western Pomerania